Eduard Ender (3 March 1822, Rome – 28 December 1883, London) was an Austrian painter.

He is the son of Johann Ender and is noted alike for his historical and genre works, among which are Francis I in the Studio of Cellini; Shakespeare Reading “Macbeth” before the Court of Elizabeth; La Corbeille de Mariage; and A Game of Chess, as well as a painting of the famous German scientist Alexander von Humboldt and his scientist travelling companion Aimé Bonpland. Humboldt did not like the painting, since the scientific instruments were not accurately depicted.

References

External links

1822 births
1883 deaths
19th-century Austrian painters
Austrian male painters
19th-century painters of historical subjects
19th-century Austrian male artists